Robert Jones (born 11 May 1981) is an English cricketer. He was a left-handed batsman and a right-arm off-break bowler who played for Buckinghamshire. He was born in Enfield.

Jones, who played for Buckinghamshire in the Minor Counties Championship between 2000 and 2003, made a single List A appearance for the side, during the 2002 season, against Sussex. From the upper-middle order, he scored 11 runs.

References

External links
Robert Jones at CricketArchive 

1981 births
Living people
English cricketers
Buckinghamshire cricketers